Ascheffel is a municipality in Rendsburg-Eckernförde, Schleswig-Holstein, Germany.

The location of Ascheffel is south of the municipality of Hummelfeld, north of Ahlefeld-Bistensee, and east of Brekendorf.

References

Municipalities in Schleswig-Holstein
Rendsburg-Eckernförde